The 1996–97 snooker season was a series of snooker tournaments played between September 1996 and May 1997. The following table outlines the results of the finals for ranking events and the invitational events.


Calendar

Official rankings 

The top 16 of the world rankings, these players automatically played in the final rounds of the world ranking events and were invited for the Masters.

Notes

References

External links

1996
Season 1997
Season 1996